Opera North is an opera company based at the Grand Theatre, Leeds. This article covers the period between the severing of its ties with English National Opera and the departure of its founding music director David Lloyd-Jones.

History
During this period, the newly independent company gave the world premiere of Wilfred Josephs's opera Rebecca, based on the novel by Daphne du Maurier and the Alfred Hitchcock film, as well as the British premieres of Ernst Krenek's Jonny spielt auf, Richard Strauss's Daphne and Verdi's Jérusalem, and the British professional premiere of Carl Nielsen's Maskarade. Jerome Kern's Show Boat, a collaboration with the Royal Shakespeare Company, was the first of the company's excursions into American musical theatre.  In addition, a number of productions of popular operas which had been borrowed from other companies were replaced by new productions.

Nicholas Payne, formerly of Welsh National Opera, replaced Graham Marchant as General Administrator in 1982, and David Lloyd-Jones's title changed from Music Director to Artistic Director.  Guest conductors included Stephen Barlow, Nicholas Cleobury, Wyn Davies, Alan Hacker, Richard Hickox, Graeme Jenkins, Diego Masson, Ali Rahbari, Carlo Rizzi, Yan Pascal Tortelier.
Notable singers for the company during the period included Josephine Barstow, Lesley Garrett, Jane Eaglen, Lynne Dawson, Sally Burgess, Wilhelmenia Fernandez (of Diva fame), Valerie Masterson, Pauline Tinsley, Felicity Palmer, William Lewis, John Mitchinson, Anthony Rolfe Johnson, Dennis O'Neill, Malcolm Donnelly, Jonathan Summers, David Wilson-Johnson, Sergei Leiferkus, Anthony Michaels-Moore, John Tomlinson, Philip Joll, Andrew Shore and Willard White.

Graham Vick's first major new opera production was ON's Così fan tutte in 1982.  Other well-known directors who worked for the company during this period included Tim Albery, David Alden, John Copley, Anthony Besch, Robert Carsen, Martin Duncan, David Freeman, Peter Gill, Colin Graham, Ian Judge, Richard Jones (whose "scratch and sniff" production of The Love for Three Oranges was subsequently seen in London, the Netherlands and at New York City Opera), Steven Pimlott, Philip Prowse, David Pountney and Andrei Şerban.

As well as performances at Opera North's regular touring venues (Nottingham, Newcastle and Salford), the company took Jonny spielt auf to Sadler's Wells Theatre in 1984–85, Tamerlano to Halle and East Berlin for Handel's tercentenary in 1985, and Aida and The Midsummer Marriage to Wiesbaden in 1985–86.

In 1990, David Lloyd-Jones relinquished the position of Opera North's Artistic Director.  In his twelve years with the company, he conducted 50 different operas by 31 different composers.   His successor, Paul Daniel, who had conducted Jérusalem in 1990, took over as Music Director at the start of the 1990–91 season.

Repertoire

Below is a list of main stage operas performed by the company during its early years as an independent entity.

Sources

References

See also
Opera North: history and repertoire, seasons 1978–79 to 1980–81
Opera North: history and repertoire, seasons 1990–91 to 1996–97
Opera North: history and repertoire, seasons 1997–98 to 2003–04
Opera North: history and repertoire, seasons 2004–

Opera North
Opera-related lists